The Overlook Film Festival is an annual film festival that takes place each May, showcasing horror films and live performances. The inaugural event took place at the Timberline Lodge in Mount Hood, Oregon in 2017. Since 2018, the festival has been held in New Orleans, Louisiana.

History
The Overlook Film Festival takes place each year in late May. The festival, which is co-directed by Landon Zakheim and Michael Lerman, originated with the Stanley Film Festival, which was run by Zakheim and Lerman in Colorado for three years. The Stanley Film Festival went on hiatus in 2016, leading to the creation of the Overlook Film Festival.

The 1st annual Overlook Film Festival took place at the Timberline Lodge in Mount Hood, Oregon, which served as the exterior of the Overlook Hotel in the 1980 film The Shining. The 2nd and 3rd annual festivals, which took place in 2018 and 2019 respectively, were held in New Orleans, Louisiana. The 4th annual Overlook Film Festival was scheduled to be held again in New Orleans, but the event was postponed indefinitely due to the COVID-19 pandemic. Instead, it was one of the partners in the Nightstream online festival.

References

External links
 

Film festivals established in 2017
Film festivals in Louisiana
Annual events in Louisiana
Fantasy and horror film festivals in the United States